Choi Byong-hyon (born 1950) is a South Korean academic and translator.

Career
Professor Byonghyon Choi, a poet, award-winning writer of Korean fiction, and scholar of English literature, is also widely regarded as a trailblazer in the translation of historically important classic Korean texts.

Translations
 Sŏng-nyong Yu, The Book of Corrections: Reflections on the National Crisis During the Japanese Invasion of Korea, 1592-1598. Institute of East Asian Studies, University of California, 2002 (a translation of Jingbirok)
 Yagyong Chong, Admonitions on Governing the People: Manual for All Administrators. University of California, 2010 (a translation of Mingmin Simseo)
 The Annals of King T'aejo: Founder of Korea's Choson Dynasty. Harvard University Press, 2014.

References

Korean–English translators
21st-century translators
South Korean academics
1950 births
Living people